Spies Like Us is a 1985 American spy comedy film directed by John Landis, and starring Chevy Chase, Dan Aykroyd, Steve Forrest, and Donna Dixon. The film presents the comic adventures of two novice intelligence agents sent to the Soviet Union. Originally written by Aykroyd and Dave Thomas to star Aykroyd and John Belushi at Universal, the script went into turnaround and was later picked up by Warner Bros., starring Aykroyd and Chase.

Partly filmed on location near Sognefjord in Norway (as Russia) and the Sahara (as Pakistan), the film is an homage to the famous Bob Hope and Bing Crosby Road to... film series. Hope himself cameos in one scene. Other cameos include directors Terry Gilliam, Sam Raimi, Costa-Gavras, Martin Brest, Frank Oz, and Joel Coen, musician B.B. King and visual effects pioneer Ray Harryhausen. The film was negatively received by critics and grossed $77 million.

Plot
Austin Millbarge is a code breaker dwelling in the dark basement at the Pentagon who aspires to escape his under-respected job to become a secret agent. Emmett Fitz-Hume, a wisecracking, pencil-pushing son of an envoy, takes the foreign service exam under peer pressure. Millbarge and Fitz-Hume meet during the test, on which Fitz-Hume openly attempts to cheat after an attempt to bribe his immediate supervisor in exchange for the answers backfires. Millbarge, however, was not prepared to take the test, having had only one day to study after his supervisor deliberately withheld a notice for two weeks leaving him vulnerable to fail and having to remain in the bowels of the Pentagon.

Needing two expendable agents to act as decoys to draw attention away from a more capable team, the Defense Intelligence Agency (DIA) decides to enlist Fitz-Hume and Millbarge, promote them to GLG-20 Foreign Service Operatives, rush them through minimal military survival training, and then send them on an undefined mission inside Pakistan and Soviet Central Asia. Meanwhile, two professional agents are well on their way to reaching the real objective: the seizure of a mobile SS-50 ICBM launcher in Soviet territory. A member of the main team is killed, while Millbarge and Fitz-Hume manage to escape multiple enemy attacks and eventually encounter Karen Boyer, the surviving operative from the main team.

In the Pamir Mountains of the Tajik Soviet Socialist Republic, the trio overpowers the mobile missile guard unit using hastily constructed extraterrestrial outfits and tranquilizer guns. Following orders in real-time from the intelligence agency (operating from the W.A.M.P. military bunker located deep under an abandoned drive-in theater), they begin to operate the launcher. At the end of their instructions, the vehicle launches the ICBM into space, targeting an unspecified area in the Continental United States. Thinking they have started a nuclear war, the American agents and their Soviet counterparts pair up to have sex before the world is destroyed.

Meanwhile, at the operations bunker, the military generals initiate the conversion of the drive-in theater to expose what is hidden beneath the screens and projection booth: a huge black-op SDI-esque laser and collector/emitter screen. The purpose of sending the agents to launch a Soviet ICBM is exposed as a means to test this anti-ballistic missile system, but the laser fails to intercept the nuclear missile. Despite this, the military commanders at W.A.M.P. choose not to inform President Ronald Reagan and the US Government that the missile launch was not initiated by the Soviet authorities, revealing a twisted contingency plan of letting the impending thermonuclear war commence to "preserve the American way of life".

Back in the Soviet Union, horrified at the thought of having launched a nuclear missile at their own country, the American spies and the Soviet missile technicians quickly use Millbarge's technical knowledge of missile guidance systems to transmit instructions to the traveling missile, diverting it off into space where it detonates harmlessly. Immediately after, the underground W.A.M.P. bunker is located and stormed by U.S. Army Rangers, and the intelligence agents and rogue military officials involved in the covert operation are arrested. Millbarge, Fitz-Hume, and Boyer go on to become nuclear disarmament negotiators, playing a nuclear version of Risk-meets-Trivial Pursuit against their new Soviet friends.

Cast

Other actors making appearances in minor roles include Jeff Harding as Fitz-Hume's associate and Heidi Sorenson as Alice, Fitz-Hume's supervisor. Also making cameo appearances are special effects designer Derek Meddings as Dr. Stinson, directors Joel Coen, Sam Raimi, and Martin Brest as the drive-in security, comedian Bob Hope as himself, musician B.B. King and directors Michael Apted and Larry Cohen as the Ace Tomato agents, and newscaster Edwin Newman as himself.

Title song
The title song, "Spies Like Us", was written and performed by Paul McCartney. It peaked at #7 on the singles chart in the United States in early 1986, his last top ten in the US until 2015. It also reached #13 in the UK. John Landis directed a music video for the song where Aykroyd and Chase can be seen performing the song with McCartney (although they didn't actually play on the record).

Landis has stated that it's "a terrible song" but couldn't say no to McCartney and Warner Bros.

Soundtrack
The film's score was composed by Elmer Bernstein and performed by the Graunke Symphony Orchestra, conducted by the composer. The soundtrack album was released by Varèse Sarabande; it does not contain the Paul McCartney song. The film also features "Soul Finger," by the Bar-Kays, also absent from the soundtrack. Fitz-Hume watches Ronald Reagan singing "I'll Be Loving You" from the musical She's Working Her Way Through College early in the film.

 "The Ace Tomato Company" (5:06)
 "Off to Spy" (1:52)
 "Russians in the Desert" (2:21)
 "Pass in the Tent" (2:58)
 "Escape" (3:25)
 "To the Bus" (3:14)
 "The Road to Russia" (3:39)
 "Rally 'Round" (2:39)
 "W.A.M.P." (2:48)
 "Martian Act" (3:08)
 "Arrest" (2:21)
 "Recall" (2:38)
 "Winners" (1:16)

Release

Box office
Spies Like Us earned $8.6 million on its US opening weekend and ultimately grossed $60 million in the United States and Canada against a budget of $22 million. The film grossed $17.2 million overseas for a worldwide total of $77.3 million.

Critical reception
The Washington Post critic Paul Attanasio called Spies Like Us "a comedy with exactly one laugh, and those among you given to Easter egg hunts may feel free to try and find it." The Chicago Reader critic Dave Kehr criticized the character development, saying that "Landis never bothers to account for the friendship that springs up spontaneously between these two antipathetic types, but then he never bothers to account for anything in this loose progression of recycled Abbott and Costello riffs." The New York Times critic Janet Maslin wrote, "The stars are always affable, and they're worth watching even when they do very little, but it's painful to sit by as the screenplay runs out of steam."

Variety magazine opined in a staff review, "Spies is not very amusing. Though Chase and Aykroyd provide moments, the overall script thinly takes on eccentric espionage and nuclear madness, with nothing new to add." TV Guide published a staff review, stating, "Landis' direction is indulgent, to say the least, with big landscapes, big crashes, big hardware, and big gags filling the screen. What he forgets is character development, that all-important factor that must exist for comedy to work well." David Parkinson, writing for the Radio Times, felt that "Dan Aykroyd and Chevy Chase simply fail to gel, and there's little fun to be had once the boisterous training school gags are exhausted."

Review aggregation website Rotten Tomatoes shows a score of 32% based on 25 reviews and an average rating of 4.38/10. The site's consensus states: "Despite the comedic prowess of its director and two leads, Spies Like Us appears to disavow all knowledge of how to make the viewer laugh." Metacritic displays a score of 22 out of 100, based on 9 critics, indicating "generally unfavorable reviews". Writing for Common Sense Media, Andrea Beach called the film a "dated '80s comedy [with] strong language, few laughs." Collider staff writer Jeff Giles, reviewing the film's Blu-ray Disc release, stated, "on the whole, it’s more amusing than funny; it’s only 102 minutes, but it feels too long by half. For all the talent involved, there’s an awful lot of flab. It’s the kind of movie you can walk away from for 10 minutes without missing anything important."

Legacy
Animated sitcom Family Guy paid tribute to the film with its 2009 episode "Spies Reminiscent of Us", which guest starred Aykroyd and Chase as fictionalized versions of themselves who, according to the series, were made real spies by Ronald Reagan after he saw the film. The episode recreates numerous scenes.

References

External links

 
 
 

1985 films
1980s action comedy films
1980s buddy comedy films
American action comedy films
American buddy comedy films
American spy comedy films
Cold War spy films
1980s English-language films
English-language Tajikistani films
Films scored by Elmer Bernstein
Films directed by John Landis
Films produced by Brian Grazer
Films set in the Soviet Union
Films set in Afghanistan
Films set in Tajikistan
1980s spy comedy films
Warner Bros. films
Films with screenplays by Dan Aykroyd
Films with screenplays by Lowell Ganz
Films with screenplays by Babaloo Mandel
Cold War in popular culture
Films about World War III
Films produced by George Folsey Jr.
Films about nuclear war and weapons
1985 comedy films
1980s American films
Films set in bunkers